Leah Malot (born July 6, 1972) is a runner from Kenya. She is known for her long career. She started her international career by winning a gold medal at the 1987 All-Africa Games, aged only 15. A decade later she was a constant competitor at the IAAF World Cross Country Championships.

Malot competed at the 1987 World Championships, but did not qualify past the 10000 metres heats. At the 1999 World Championships she failed to finish the 10000 metres race. She won 5000 metres at the 2000 ISTAF meeting of IAAF Golden League meeting in Berlin timing 14 minutes, 39.83 seconds, a new African Record. The previous African record, 14:40.19 was set by Zahra Ouaziz of Morocco in 1998, while the previous Kenyan record, 14:46.41 was held by Rose Cheruiyot since 1996. However, Malot failed at the Kenyan trials for the 2000 Summer Olympics. Malot won 3000 metres at the 2002 IAAF Super Grand Prix event in Qatar. She won Kenyan trials for the 2003 World Championships, but eventually did not compete in Paris. The same year she won IAAF Grand Prix 5000 metres at the Osaka meeting 

She won the 1998 Dam tot Damloop race in the Netherlands. and 2003 Philadelphia Distance Run. At the Lisbon Half Marathon, she finished second in 2003 and 2004. She used to hold the 3000 metres African indoor record.

On the cross country circuit, she won twice consecutively at the Oeiras International Cross Country meeting and narrowly missed out on a third win in 2003, finishing second but with the same time as Merima Denboba.

Malot is still active as of 2009. She finished 6th at the 2008 Frankfurt Marathon, 5th at the 2009 Lisbon Half Marathon, 7th at the 2009 Paris Marathon, 6th at the 2009 Berlin Marathon and 5th at the 2009 Singapore Marathon.

Achievements

References

External links

1972 births
Living people
Kenyan female long-distance runners
African Games gold medalists for Kenya
African Games medalists in athletics (track and field)
Kenyan female cross country runners
Athletes (track and field) at the 1987 All-Africa Games
Athletes (track and field) at the 1999 All-Africa Games
Athletes (track and field) at the 2003 All-Africa Games
20th-century Kenyan women
21st-century Kenyan women